Pachytrachelus cribriceps is a species of beetle in the family Carabidae, the only species in the genus Pachytrachelus.

References

Harpalinae